Pultenaea hartmannii is a species of flowering plant in the family Fabaceae and is endemic to an area around the border between New South Wales and Queensland. It is an erect shrub with hairy stems, oblong to triangular leaves with the narrower end towards the base, and yellow flowers with red  markings.

Description
Pultenaea hartmannii is an erect shrub with hairy stems. The flowers are yellow with red markings, arranged in small, leafy clusters near the ends of branchlets.

Taxonomy and naming
Pultenaea hartmannii was first formally described in 1874 by Ferdinand von Mueller in Fragmenta phytographiae Australiae from specimens collected by Carl Heinrich Hartmann.

Distribution and habitat
This pultenaea grows in forest on granite near Jennings on the Northern Tablelands of New South Wales and in south-eastern Queensland.

Conservation status
This species is listed as "least concern" under the Queensland Government Nature Conservation Act 1992.

References

hartmannii
Flora of New South Wales
Flora of Queensland
Plants described in 1874
Taxa named by Ferdinand von Mueller